Xavier Pascual Fuertes (born 8 March 1968) is a Spanish former handball player and the current coach of CS Dinamo București and the Romania national team. He is one of the most successful handball coaches.

On 9 February 2009, he replaced Manolo Cadenas as head coach of Barcelona. Contemporaneously with his club job, he has been also coaching the Romania men's national handball team since June 6, 2016. In June 2018, Pascual resigned as Romania coach.

International honours

Player 
 Barcelona

 Liga ASOBAL: 2
1989-90, 1990-91

 Supercopa ASOBAL: 1
1986-87

European Cup: 1
 1991

Manager  
 Barcelona
 Liga ASOBAL: 11 
 2010-11, 2011-12, 2012-13, 2013-14, 2014-15, 2015-16, 2016-17, 2017–18, 2018–19, 2019–20, 2020–21

 Copa del Rey: 10 
 2008-09, 2009–10, 2013-14, 2014-15, 2015-16, 2016–17, 2017–18, 2018–19, 2019–20, 2020–21

 Copa ASOBAL: 11 
 2009–10, 2011–12, 2012–13, 2013–14, 2014–15, 2015–16, 2016–17, 2017–18, 2018–19, 2019–20, 2020–21

 Supercopa ASOBAL: 10
2009–10, 2012–13, 2013–14, 2014–15, 2015–16, 2016–17, 2017–18, 2018–19, 2019–20, 2020–21

EHF Champions League: 3
 2011, 2015, 2021

IHF Super Globe: 5
 2013, 2014, 2017, 2018, 2019

 Dinamo Bucharest
 Liga Națională: 
 2021–22

 Romanian Cup: 
 2021–22

 Romanian Super Cup: 
 2022

References

1968 births
Living people
Sportspeople from Barcelona
Spanish male handball players
Liga ASOBAL players
FC Barcelona Handbol players
CB Ademar León players
Spanish handball coaches
Spanish expatriate sportspeople in Romania
Handball players from Catalonia
Handball coaches of international teams